Hans Schumann Lem (19 November 1888 – 1 May 1962) was a Norwegian gymnast who competed in the 1908 Summer Olympics. As a member of the Norwegian team, he won the silver medal in the gymnastics team event in 1908.

References

1888 births
1962 deaths
Norwegian male artistic gymnasts
Gymnasts at the 1908 Summer Olympics
Olympic gymnasts of Norway
Olympic silver medalists for Norway
Olympic medalists in gymnastics
Medalists at the 1908 Summer Olympics